Thomas Drew may refer to:

Thomas Drew (cricketer) (1875–1928), Australian cricketer
Thomas Drew (MP) in the 14th century for Bishop's Lynn
Thomas Drue (c. 1586–1627), also spelt Drew, English playwright
Thomas Stevenson Drew (1802–1879), US politician
Sir Thomas Drew (architect) (1838–1910), Irish architect
Thomas Drew (diplomat) (born 1970), British diplomat
Thomas E. Drew (born 1950), former Vermont Adjutant General